Melchor Saucedo Mendoza (January 15, 1920 – January 23, 2014) was a Mexican Anglican bishop. He was bishop of the Episcopal Diocese of Western Mexico, serving from 1973 until his retirement, in 1981.

External links 
Death in our diocesan family: The Rt. Rev. Melchor Saucedo
Obituary

1920 births
2014 deaths
Mexican Anglican priests
Anglican bishops of Western Mexico